The Borreliaceae are a family of spirochete bacteria.

References

Spirochaetes
Gram-negative bacteria
Bacteria families